Long Journey Home (Live in Liverpool) is an album by the Canadian alt-country band Cowboy Junkies, recorded in Liverpool, England in 2004 and released in 2006. The release includes a concert DVD along with a CD. Only 11 tracks of the 18 that are on the DVD appear on the CD.

Track listing 
CD

DVD

DVD bonus features
Interview with Mike Timmins and Margo Timmins
Interview with Jaro Czerwinec and Jeff Bird
Interview with Alan Anton and Peter Timmins
Soundcheck and behind-the-scenes footage

References

External links 

2006 live albums
Cowboy Junkies live albums